Simon John Emmerson Brown (born 29 June 1969 in Cleadon, County Durham) is an English former cricketer who played as a left-arm medium-fast bowler and right-handed batsman. He played one Test for England in 1996. Domestically, he played for Northamptonshire from 1987 to 1990 and Durham from 1991 to 2002, before being released due to injuries.

As well as players such as Mark Ilott, Alan Mullally, Mike Smith and Paul Taylor, Brown was one of the myriad of left-arm bowlers tried by England during the 1990s. Like Smith, he was a "one-Test Wonder", playing in only a single Test match, which England lost to Pakistan. Despite taking two wickets, including Aamir Sohail with his tenth ball, he never played for England again.

References

External links

1969 births
Living people
People from the Metropolitan Borough of South Tyneside
England Test cricketers
Durham cricketers
Northamptonshire cricketers
Scarborough Festival President's XI cricketers
Cricketers from Tyne and Wear